The 2010–11 Serbian First League  season is the 5th season of the Serbian First league (Basketball), the third professional basketball league in Serbia.  The 182-game regular season (26 games for each of the 14 teams) began on Saturday, October 2, 2010, and will end on Sunday, April 17, 2011.

Teams for 2010–11 season
Group North

Regular season

Serbian Second League Group North

Group Central

Regular season

Serbian Second League Group Central

Group East

Regular season

Serbian Second League Group East

Group West

Regular season

Serbian Second League Group West

P=Matches played, W=Matches won, L=Matches lost, F=Points for, A=Points against, D=Points difference, Pts=Points

External links
https://web.archive.org/web/20110613061217/http://www.kss.rs/pag/news.php?lang=ser&page=1&news=aktuelnosti

Serbian First League (basketball)
3